Bastian Oczipka (born 12 January 1989) is a German footballer who plays as a left back for 2. Bundesliga club Arminia Bielefeld.

Career
Oczipka began his career 1994 with SV Blau-Weiß Hand. After three years, he joined SSG Bergisch Gladbach in summer 1997. He played two years in the youth teams of SSG Bergisch Gladbach before he was scouted by Bayer Leverkusen in July 1999. In 2008, Leverkusen loaned him to F.C. Hansa Rostock. After two and a half years, he left Rostock to return to Bayer 04 Leverkusen, but the Werksclub loaned him again, this time to FC St. Pauli on 5 January 2010.

Although FC St. Pauli showed interest in a continued commitment beyond the loan period, Oczipka returned to Leverkusen in the summer of 2011. However, he came for Bayer in the 2011/12 season only to nine Bundesliga and three Champions League appearances.

In the summer break 2012 Oczipka joined the Bundesliga rookie Eintracht Frankfurt with a three-year contract, starting from the 2012–13 Bundesliga season for an undisclosed transfer fee. In his first season for the Hesse team, he played 33 games in which he set up nine assists, and qualified with his team for the UEFA Europa League. In March 2015, Oczipka extended his contract with Eintracht Frankfurt for another three years until June 30, 2018. On May 9, 2015, Oczipka scored his first Bundesliga goal for a 1-0 lead in a 3-1 victory at home against TSG 1899 Hoffenheim.

On 15 July 2017, his move to FC Schalke 04 was announced. For the Royal Blues he received a contract until July 30, 2020 and the squad number 24. His debut was on 19 August 2017 (1st matchday) in a 2-0 home win against RB Leipzig.

On 30 August 2021, Oczipka agreed to join Union Berlin.

After his contract with Union terminated in June 2022, he signed with Arminia Bielefeld.

International career
Oczipka is a youth international footballer. He is eligible for the Poland national football team through his grandparents, who are from Upper Silesia.

Career statistics

References

External links

1989 births
Living people
People from Bergisch Gladbach
Sportspeople from Cologne (region)
German footballers
Germany youth international footballers
Bayer 04 Leverkusen players
Bayer 04 Leverkusen II players
FC Hansa Rostock players
FC St. Pauli players
Eintracht Frankfurt players
FC Schalke 04 players
1. FC Union Berlin players
Arminia Bielefeld players
Bundesliga players
2. Bundesliga players
Association football defenders
Footballers from North Rhine-Westphalia